Skriverøya is a peninsula in the Iddefjord in the municipality of Halden in Viken county, Norway. Here, one can fine cultural artefacts from the Iron Age, including the largest Nordic swords, and warhammers.

External links 
Skriverøya

Halden
Peninsulas of Viken